The 1er Régiment de Parachutistes d'Infanterie de Marine or 1er RPIMa is a unit of the French Army Special Forces Command, therefore part of the Special Operations Command. 

Heirs to the Free French paratroopers of the 3rd and 4th squadrons of the Special Air Service (SAS) founded in the United Kingdom during WWII, the 1er RPIMa is sometimes referred to as the "French SAS" and still uses the same motto as their British counterparts to this day:  (French for "Who Dares Wins").

Origins 

Quite unusually for the French Armed Forces, the affiliations of this unit are various, not directly related to each other, and numerous. The regiment is heir simultaneously to formations of the French Air Force, mainland infantry, Troupes coloniales and Troupes de marine.

World War II 

 September 15, 1940, the 1st Air Infantry Company (Free French) (1e Compagnie d'Infanterie de l'Air: 1e C.I.A) was created in the United Kingdom by Captain Georges Bergé.
 March 15, 1941: Operation Savanna, the first operation of the Special Operations Executive (SOE) in France, an ambush in Brittany.
 On April 10, 1941 the 1st Air Infantry Company (1e C.I.A) was reattached to the Free French forces and renamed 1er Compagnie Parachutiste (1st Parachute Company).
 May 1941: Operation Josephine B (destruction of six transformers at the electric plant in Pessac).
 Divided into one section assigned to the BCRA intelligence unit, and two other sections sent to the Middle East. 
 July 21, 1941: embarked for the Mideast, garrisoned in Beirut, then Damascus.
 On September 25, 1941 the 1st Parachute Company became the Peloton Parachutiste du Levant (Parachute Platoon of the Levant) and was attached to the French Air Force.
 On October 15, 1941 the unit's name changed again, to the 1er Compagnie de Chasseurs Parachutistes, (1er C.C.P) (1st Parachute Chasseur Company).
 On January 1, 1942 the unit became the French Squadron of the Special Air Service under Major David Stirling, a special forces unit garrisoned at Kibrit Air Base on the Suez Canal.
 June 1942: the French SAS destroyed 20 German airplanes in Crete, then attacked the airports in Matouba-Derna, Benina, Barce and Benghazi on the Libyan front.
 July 1942: operations in Cyrenaica.
 January 1943: harassed the German rear-guard in Tunisia.
 Spring 1943: rest and training at Camberley (England).
 On July 1, 1943 the unit became the 1er Bataillon d'Infanterie de l'Air, (1er B.I.A) (1st Air Infantry Battalion).
 In November 1943 the 1st Battalion was renamed 4e Bataillon d'Infanterie de l'Air, (4e B.I.A) (4th Air Infantry Battalion)
 Beginning 1944: training of French SAS in Scotland. The battalion was assigned to the Special Air Service.
 Night of June 5–6: parachuted into Brittany, 36 paratroopers  of the FFL in four groups (two over Plumelec, two over Duault). The sole battle casualty in Plumelec (on June 6 at 0 h 40), caporal Emile Bouétard, was probably the first casualty of the Normandy Landing.
 June 1944: combined forces with the French Forces of the Interior (FFI) and the 2nd U.S. Division.
 June 1944: fighting along with the maquis de Saint-Marcel, Morbihan and maquis of Duault in Côtes-d'Armor; a battalion (450 men) parachuted in with the French Forces of the Interior (FFI) 3000 total, tied up 85000 Germans in Brittany, preventing them from reaching Normandy, and joined two divisions of George Patton’s army on August 6.
 On July 1, 1944 the 4th Battalion was renamed 2e R.C.P S.A.S (2nd SAS Parachute Chasseur Regiment) of the 4th SAS Regiment.
 August 1944: operations and SAS participation in the Liberation of Paris.
 September 11, 1944: one company took 3000 Germans prisoner.
 Autumn: rest leave in Champagne.
 November 11, 1944: the two regiments of the French SAS marched up the Champs-Élysées in Paris before General Charles de Gaulle and British Prime Minister Winston Churchill after the 2e RCP was awarded the Compagnon de la Libération designation (Companion of the Liberation).
 December 23, 1944: provided reinforcement in the Ardennes.
 February 1945: regrouped in England.
 Night of April 7–8, 1945: Operation Amherst, parachuted into the Netherlands. Fighting until the 18th.
 On August 1, 1945 the Parachute Chasseur Regiments merged completely into the French Army. The 3rd Parachute Chasseur Regiment (3e R.C.P) or 3rd SAS Regiment was dissolved and its components transferred to the 2e R.C.P.

Indochina war

The colonial battalions 
 On February 1, 1946 the 1er Battaillon de Choc S.A.S, (1e B.C-S.A.S) (1st SAS Shock Battalion) was created from elements of the 1st Parachute Chasseur Regiment (1e R.C.P ) and the 2nd Parachute Chasseur Regiment (2e R.C.P).
 On February 23, 1946 the battalion became the 1er Bataillon Parachutiste S.A.S, (1e B.P-S.A.S) (1st S.A.S Parachute Battalion).
 On March 1, 1946 the 2e Battaillon de Choc S.A.S, (2e B.C-S.A.S) (2nd S.A.S shock battalion) was created from elements of the 1st Parachute Chasseur Regiment (1e R.C.P) and the 1st Shock Parachute Infantry Regiment (1e R.I.C.A.P).
 On September 25, 1947 the two S.A.S para battalions regrouped and became the 1er Bataillon Parachutiste SAS, (1e B.P-S.A.S) (1st S.A.S Parachute Battalion).
 On January 1, 1948 the battalion became the 1er Bataillon Colonial de Commandos Parachutistes, (1e B.C.C.P) (1st Colonial Parachute Commando Battalion).
 On July 4, 1948 the 1e B.C.C.P was dissolved.
 On December 7, 1949 another 1st Colonial Parachute Commando Battalion (1e B.C.C.P) was created.
 On October 1, 1950 the colonial parachute commandos became the 1er Groupe Colonial de Commandos Parachutistes, (1e G.C.C.P) (1st Colonial Parachute Commando Group).
 On March 1, 1951 the parachute commando group became the 1er Bataillon de Parachutiste Coloniaux, (1e B.P.C) (1st Colonial Parachute Battalion).
 On January 19, 1952 the 1st Colonial Parachute Battalion, (1e B.P.C) was dissolved.
 On June 20, 1953 another 1st Colonial Parachute Battalion, (1er B.P.C) was created.

The colonial brigades 
 On July 1, 1946 the 1er Demi-Brigade de Parachutistes SAS, 1er D-B.P.SAS (1st SAS Parachute Demi-Brigade) was created in Indochina from the 1st and 2nd SAS Parachute Battalions.
 On October 1, 1947 the Demi-Brigade Coloniale de Commandos Parachutistes D-B.C.C.P (Colonial Parachute Commando Demi-Brigade) was created in Brittany.
 On October 23, 1947 the SAS Demi-Brigade became the Demi-Brigade Coloniale de Commandos Parachutistes SAS, D-B.C.C.P-S.A.S, (SAS Colonial Parachute Commando Demi-Brigade).
 In June 1948 the two demi-Brigades became: in Brittany, the 1e D-B.C.C.P and the 2e D-B.C.C.P in Indochina.
 On February 1, 1955: the 1e D-B.CCP became the Colonial Parachute Brigade ( BPC ).

Post-Indochina 

 The brigade 
 On February 25, 1958 the B.P.C became the Brigade école des Parachutistes Coloniaux, (B.E.P.C) (Colonial Parachute Brigade Instruction Center).
 On December 1, 1958 the B.E.P.C became the Brigade de Parachutistes d'Outre-Mer, (B.P.OM) (Overseas Parachute Brigade).
 On November 1, 1960 the B.P.OM became the Brigade Parachutiste d'Infanterie de Marine, B.P.I.Ma (Marine Infantry Parachute Brigade).
 On December 31, 1961 the B.P.I.Ma was dissolved.

The regiment 
 On November 1, 1960 the Center of Instruction of the 1st Marine Infantry Parachute Regiment was created at Bayonne.
 On January 1, 1973 the 1st Marine Infantry Parachute Regiment, 1er (R.P.I.Ma) was assigned and tasked with special operations.

History, garrisons, campaigns and battles 

Despite its name, the 1er RPIMa is part of the French Army, like other Marine units. The naval infantry background dates back to 1762, when units of the French Army were detached to the French Navy for ship-borne and overseas duties.

It is the heir to the first Colonial Parachute Commando Demi-Brigade, whose origins date back to World War II. Under the command of Captain Georges Bergé, the 1st Air Company was created in England on September 15, 1940 with parachute units of the Special Air Service (SAS). The 1e CCP/SAS was created in 1941 in Scotland. From 1942 to 1944, this company was engaged in Crete, Libya, Tunisia, Brittany, Belgium, and the Netherlands.

Afterwards, the company was dissolved and re-designated as an SAS Parachute Demi-Brigade from 1946 to 1949, then 1st Colonial Parachute Commando Demi-Brigade from 1949 to 1955 in Indochina. It was classified as B.P.C in Algeria from 1955 to 1958, the B.C.C.P dissolved and re-designated from 1959 to 1960 as G.I.B.P.OM then in 1960 B.P.C.I.Ma and renamed in 1962 1erR.P.I.Ma which retained the SAS emblem.

Successive garrisons 
 September 1940: RAF Ringway (England)
 1941: Beirut then Damascus.
 1942: Kabrit on the Suez Canal.
 1943: Camberley, United Kingdom
 Following the war, in France
 1960: Creation of the 1eR.P.I.Ma and Garrison at Bayonne

World War II 
 
The 1er RPIMa inherited the traditions of the two Free French Special Air Service (SAS) Regiments that served with distinction alongside the British  SAS Brigade during World War II.
On September 15, 1940, General Charles de Gaulle signed the activation order of the 1ère Compagnie d'Infanterie de l'Air (1ère CIA) of the Free French Forces, or 1st Free French Airborne Infantry Company, under the command of Captain Bergé.

The 1ère CIA began operational missions, parachuting into occupied France in March 1941. The company was then split into two units, a covert action unit used for clandestine operations and a conventional and uniformed company sent to North Africa in September 1941 to fight Axis Forces along with British Forces.

A very good relationship was quickly established between Captain Bergé and Major Stirling, the commander of the newly created Special Air Service (SAS); the French detachment was soon incorporated into the SAS and became the French Squadron. From 1942 to 1943, the French SAS roamed the region, ranging as far as Crete hunting down Axis forces and destroying their aircraft and supply dumps. In November 1943, the 3rd and 4th Air Infantry were created and incorporated into the SAS Brigade along with their British and Belgian counterparts, the 1st and 2nd SAS Regiments.

The Free French SAS took an important part in the liberation of Europe. In Brittany, a little after midnight on D-Day, June 6, 1944, Caporal Emile Bouétard (born in Brittany, 1915) was the first soldier killed in action in Plumelec, Morbihan. On August 1, 1944, the 3rd and 4th Air Infantry battalions were renamed the 2nd and 3rd Chasseur Parachute battalions. As a reward for their bravery, King George VI awarded the Free French SAS the right to wear the red beret of the British SAS, which replaced the black beret worn until then. As the war drew to a close, 52 French SAS "sticks" (705 men) were parachuted into the Netherlands on April 7, 1945, causing major havoc in the rear areas of German occupation forces and easing pressure on the forward thrust of the 2nd Canadian Army Corps.

The Free French SAS took a major part in the epic battles of the SAS in Africa, France, Belgium, the Netherlands and Germany, earning French and foreign awards (including many British DSOs, MCs and MMs). The regimental colours of the 1er RPIMa have also been decorated with the U.S. Bronze Star Medal, the Dutch Bronze Cross and the Belgian Croix de Guerre. Today, this SAS heritage is still evident in its regimental motto "Qui Ose Gagne" ("Who Dares Wins") and in the awarding of the RAPAS Wings, reminiscent of the wartime SAS "Operational Wings" that can only be awarded to 1er RPIMa operators after they have successfully passed a series of strict selection requirements, including operational deployments.

1945–1974 

Between 1945 and 1954 the unit that was later to become the 1er RPIMa after a series of name changes, took part in the war in Indochina, performing several of the more than 160 combat jumps carried out by French paratroopers during that conflict. After the war, the regiment underwent structural changes and became a training depot for the entire colonial airborne forces. As such, it did not take part in the Algerian conflict.

In 1960 1er RPIMa was created. It continued in the training role until 1974, when the 1er RPIMa was transformed into a Special Forces unit, a role it still plays today.

1974–2006 
The unit's mission has been mostly to support France's interests in Africa. Between 1974 and 1981, the 1er RPIMa underwent another mission change to focus on long-range reconnaissance patrols for almost a decade, while it still used its training skills to training friendly forces abroad.

In the 80s and 90s the regiment deployed dozens of times to various hotspots on the planet. While engaged in Operation Desert Storm, the 1er RPIMa lost two of its men in Iraq in 1991.

A year later, the creation of the French Special Operations Command (Commandement des Opérations Spéciales, COS) led to a major shake-up of French special forces units to incorporate the lessons learned in the First Gulf War. As part of this process, in 1997, the nucleus of what was to become the army's BFST (Brigade des Forces Spéciales Terre) (Land Special Forces Brigade) was created and the 1er RPIMa became its core unit. All the while, the regiment participated in operations in the Balkans and in Africa; it was specifically involved in stalking war criminals in Bosnia, leading to several successful arrests of individuals indicted for war crimes.

Today 

Part of the French Army Special Forces Command (COM FST), the 1er RPIMa is a modern, highly skilled and experienced Special Forces unit organized along company lines. The main strength of the regiment lies in its three RAPAS companies (RAPAS meaning Airborne Reconnaissance and Special Action) each specialised in a specific field such as HAHO/HALO, Counter-Terrorism, amphibious, jungle, mountain or motorized patrols operations and its RAPAS Signal company dedicated to C3 (Command, Control and Communications) support for Special Operations.

The 1er RPIMa also fields a Training and Operations company tasked with providing selection, basic and continuation training of the unit's manpower and a logistics company which supports the regiment in its daily and operational missions. As the unit was inspired by the British Special Air Service, it has still much in common with them, including missions and capabilities.

Unit specialization 
 CTLO (Counter-terrorism and hostage rescue teams)
 GDC (Garde du Corps)
 THP/TELD (Tireurs Haute Précision / Tireur d'élite longue distance, snipers)
 SCO (Paratrooper – SAS Chuteurs Opérationnels)
 PAT SAS (motorized patrols. Patrouilles SAS)
 SPO (SAS Plongeurs Offensifs, offensive divers)
 Mountain, arctic, desert, and jungle warfare
 Explosives and demolitions

Organisation and structure 
Due to its long history with the British Special Air Service much of the 1er RPIMA core aspects are based upon the British SAS. Each company specializes in a particular area.
 Four main RAPAS (Airborne Reconnaissance and Special Action) combat companies:
 1e Compagnie: Paratroopers, HAHO HALO, counter-terrorism, and bodyguards
 2e Compagnie: Mountain, arctic, desert and jungle warfare
 3e Compagnie: Motorized patrols
 4e Compagnie: Counter terrorism, hostage rescue, and reconnaissance in urban areas

There is also one command and logistics company and a training and operations company which is in charge of recruiting, and initial and continuing training.

Each company is split in RAPAS sections. Each section includes 30 men.

The 1er RPIMa is based in Bayonne, which makes amphibious and mountain training possible. This location is also ideal due to its proximity to the Centre d'Entrainement Adaptée (CTA), Europe's largest and most modern Close Quarter Battle (CQB) facility and to the dedicated assets of the French army's Special Forces Aviation Detachment (DAOS) and airborne school (ETAP), both establishments that are essential to its training and operations.

Weapons and equipment 
The main weapon used by the 1er RPIMa is the HK416 5.56x45mm assault rifle. Besides this, SIG 550, M4 and FN SCAR assault rifles are also used by French Army Special Forces. Sometimes M203 or HK69 grenade launchers are also used. For CQB the MP5 series and FN P90 are used as the main weapons, the 10.4 inches version of the HK416 is also sometimes used. The Glock 17 and H&K USP are the standard sidearm carried by the soldiers. The ARWEN 37 mm grenade launcher is used in CQB work to launch CS gas into buildings. The Benelli M4 shotgun is also used during CQB, to take down doors. FN Minimi is used as light machine gun, 5.56mm and 7.62mm, and snipers use the HK417 or Hecate II rifles. Sometimes MILAN missiles have been used in combat to provide fire support.

They wear standard French camouflage and webbing, except when doing CT/HR/CQB work. CQB kit includes a black balaclava, black nomex coveralls, non-slip boots, special webbing and holsters, medical kit for teams medics, gas masks, and special communications equipment.

VPS Panhard VPS (Véhicule Patrouille SAS), based on the Mercedes-Benz 270 CDI G-Class 4x4 light tactical vehicle, is the vehicle used by French Army Special Forces. It is a rapidly deployable vehicle capable of long-duration missions in extremes of climate. An armored floor provides anti-landmine protection to the crew and VPS is air transportable by C-160 Transall or C-130 Hercules. In the French Army the VPS is equipped with 360° ring-mount over the rear body which is armed with a Browning 12.7mm heavy machine gun or Gatling machine gun. One more 7.62mm machine is mounted on swivel station at the front of the crew compartment which is operated by the vehicle commander.

Skills 
The 1er RPIMa is tasked with several jobs. These include: bodyguard for VIPs in conflict areas, direct action, reconnaissance, sabotage, unconventional warfare and hostage rescue. While their name states they are Marine Infantry, they are in fact Army.

The 1er RPIMa relies on a number of skills to successfully carry out its missions. Most skills are either regiment or brigade-specific and need constant honing to be kept at the desired level of proficiency. They can be divided into several generic fields:
 The RAPAS (Airborne Reconnaissance and Special Action) basic skills
 RAPAS skill training is given to enlisted men and NCOs after they have completed a series of organic and basic regimental courses
 Basic training leading to the first rung of the RAPAS ladder is the elementary RAPAS technical certificate, which takes six months to earn.
 RAPAS training covers all the basics of special forces functions and is complemented by specific courses (marking out drop zones (DZ) and landing zone (LZ), basic and advanced close quarters combat, sniping...)
 A RAPAS group is led by a senior non-commissioned officer or a lieutenant. NCOs are generally former enlisted men who rose from the ranks of the regiment, while officers come from various specialized schools (mostly Infantry, Armour and Engineer) before following a specific course complemented by on-the-job training.
 When fully qualified and operational, a RAPAS team member reaches the rank of Caporal-chef (Master Corporal), and has been in the regiment for five years and spent more than two thirds of that taking classes, has been deployed in real-world operations, probably once a year.
 Air insertion
 Parachute operations: each member of the regiment is static-line parachute qualified using some specific low-altitude (125 meters) dropping techniques. The 1er RPIMa can also field different teams proficient in both HAHO and HALO techniques. Each company has HALO capability.
 Helicopter operations: Fast-roping and helicopter rappelling, special purpose infiltration and extraction rigs, LZ marking, special operation procedures, helicopter fire support, helicopter-borne sniper support, light helicopter insertion and extraction
 Air delivery: the 1er RPIMa is unique in the way it has integrated air delivery component with teams able to rig and airdrop light to heavy loads and pallets in support of special operations from cargo aircraft of dedicated special operations division of the French air force.
 Amphibious operations
 Open circuit breathing apparatus: the 1er RPIMa can field a complete open air circuit (scuba) team for beach recce or riverine operations using light crafts, including kayaks
 Closed circuit breathing apparatus: the 1er RPIMa can field a complete closed circuit team for covert underwater missions. This team is not a combat diver team; its purpose is to use waterways as another infiltration method.
 Motorised operations
 True to their SAS ancestors, the 1er RPIMa has always maintained a motorized patrol capability. It currently centres on PATSAS patrols that are tasked with developing and refining the methods and equipment needed for such operations. In addition to the PATSAS, each RAPAS company fields several motorised RAPAS groups. The mounts of motorised patrols are modified Peugeot P4s, Mercedes VPS and ACMAT VLRA trucks, all fitted with machine guns, automatic cannons, mortars, AGLs or ATGWs.
 The Special Recce Patrols (PRS): Having understood with time and experience that it is always better to act on intelligence which had been gathered and analyzed by operators that intimately know which method of operation would be best used by the action groups, the 1er RPIMa has decided to include in its specialized teams the PRS concept. The PRS are infiltrated ahead of the action teams and provide real time intelligence on the target area. The information gathered by the PRS is then transmitted by a variety of secure means to the command level which then disseminates it to the action groups.
 Counter Terrorism
 The 1er RPIMa can field several CT teams, all backed by specialized sniper teams proficient in calibers ranging from 5.56 mm to 12.7 mm (.50 cal)
 All ranks of the company are CT trained
 The Regiment benefits from proximity to the Centre d'Entraînement Adapté (CTA), Europe's largest and most modern CQB facility (CQB = Close Quarters Battle or Killing House). The CTA is located in Pau and offers unmatched live firing capabilities for all sorts of CT scenarios.
 The CQB skills are kept honed to a high level thanks to regular training in the CTA and cross training with French and Allied CT units.
 Bodyguard teams
 The 1er RPIMa has been involved in bodyguard duties for the last 25 years.
 The Regiment only provides Bodyguard teams to high-ranking officials at theater level.
 A fully qualified RAPAS team member is also Bodyguard qualified
 Jungle, desert and mountain operations
 So as to prepare RAPAS units of the 1er RPIMa for operations over difficult terrain it can use French and foreign training centers on the world
 Mountain, jungle and desert training exercises are scheduled every year
 RAPAS team members are sent regularly as permanent instructors to jungle and desert schools in French Guiana or friendly African countries
 Every year, the Regiment sends some of its members to foreign schools to improve its tactics and procedures in hostile environments (jungle, bush...)
 A regular influx of experienced NCOs volunteering from the French 27th Mountain Infantry Brigade keeps the Regiment up-to-date on modern mountaineering techniques

Selection and training 
Officers and NCOs joining the regiment have to attend the same selection and training as enlisted personnel.

Enlisted soldiers in the French Army can try to join super RPIMA, between their first and third years of active duty.

First step is a profile selection: Candidates will be selected regarding unit requirements and personal file (e.g. if the regiment needs some mountain specialists, they will ask for more mountain troopers to come for the selection). Candidates selected must attend the two weeks basic airborne training prior the SF training, for those who are not already enlisted in an airborne regiment.

Second step of selection is "adaptation training" and "stage commando" lasting twelve weeks. Candidates must be above average to continue the training. Most cases of failure and RTU occur during this phase.

The last step of selection is the "stage CTE RAPAS" lasting six months. After completion of this "stage", candidates are fully assigned to the regiment as special force soldier. They will attend additional training to become specialists (bodyguards, pathfinders, etc.)

Traditions

Anniversary of the Troupes de Marine 

The anniversary is celebrated of fighting in Bazeilles, a village which was taken and abandoned four consecutive times under orders, on August 31 and September 1, 1870.

 Et au Nom de Dieu, vive la coloniale !
 In the Name of God, long live the colonial !

The Marsouins and the Bigors have for Saint, God. This war calling concludes intimate ceremonies which part life in the regiments. Often also at origin as an act of grace to Charles de Foucauld.

Patron Saint

Saint-Michael: As a paratrooper regiment, the 1er R.P.I.Ma celebrates each year on September 29, the Patron-Saint of Paratroopers.  This celebration gives rise to various events with veterans.

Motto 
« Who dares wins » is the general motto of the British SAS, translated in French to « Qui ose gagne ».

Insignia

Regimental Colors 
The unit is the only parachute regiments of the Marines to wear purple berets as opposed to the standard red beret of other units.

Honors

Battle honours 
The list of operations shows a world-wide commitment since it ranges from Afghanistan to Africa and the Balkans.
 Crete 1942
 Libye 1942
 Sud Tunisien 1943
 France 1944
 Ardennes Belges 1945
 Hollande 1945
 Indochine 1946-1954
 Koweït 1990–1991
 2011 Libyan civil war

Decorations 
The most decorated French and allied unit of the Second World War
 Croix de la Légion d'honneur.
 Ordre de la Libération as heir to the 2nd Parachute Chasseur Regiment of the Air Force, the regiment bears wearing the decoration bestowed on November 11, 1944 by général Charles de Gaulle, under the Arc de Triomphe at Paris to the 2nd Parachute Chasseur Regiment 2e R.C.P of the Air Force.
 Croix de guerre 1939-1945 with 6 palms.
 Croix de guerre des Théâtres d'opérations extérieurs (T.O.E) with 3 palms.
 Croix de la Valeur militaire avec 3 palms.
 Bronze Lion.

The officers and members of this regiment wear one of four Fourragères:
 The Fourragère bearing colors of the Légion d'Honneur 1re Brigade de Parachutistes Coloniaux
 The fourragere bearing colors of the Croix des T.O.E
 The fourragere bearing colors of the Valeur Militaire
 The fourragere bearing colors of the Croix de la libération (since June 18, 1996).( that of the 2e R.C.P).

See also 
 List of French paratrooper units
 1st Parachute Chasseur Regiment
 Long Range Desert Group

References

External links 
 1er RPIMa Official website
 QUI OSE GAGNE: Association des Anciens Parachutistes Troupe de Marine et anciens de la Brigade des Parachutistes Coloniaux héritiers des S.A.S
 QUI OSE GAGNE: Association des Anciens Parachutistes Troupe de Marine et anciens de la Brigade des Parachutistes Coloniaux héritiers des S.A.S
 QUI OSE GAGNE: Association des Anciens Parachutistes Troupe de Marine et anciens de la Brigade des Parachutistes Coloniaux héritiers des S.A.S

Parachute infantry regiments of France
Special forces of France
20th-century regiments of France
21st-century regiments of France
Bayonne
Companions of the Liberation
Military counterterrorist organizations
Marines regiments of France
Military units and formations established in 1941